Mount Rogers is the highest natural point in Virginia, United States, with a summit elevation of  above mean sea level. The summit straddles the border of Grayson and Smyth Counties, Virginia, about  WSW of Troutdale, Virginia. Most of the mountain is contained within the Lewis Fork Wilderness, while the entire area is part of the Mount Rogers National Recreation Area, which itself is a part of the Jefferson National Forest.

The mountain is named for William Barton Rogers, a Virginian educated at the College of William & Mary, who taught at William & Mary and the University of Virginia, became Virginia's first State Geologist, and went on to found the Massachusetts Institute of Technology.

One reference disk has been obscured by dense overgrowth. Because the Appalachian Trail passes within a half mile of the summit, the area is especially popular with hikers.

Geology
The Mount Rogers area contains a unique record of the geohistory of Virginia. There is evidence from the rocks that volcanoes were part of the landscape. Roughly 750 million years ago, rift-related (divergent) volcanoes erupted along the axis of what later became the Appalachians, and one remnant of that volcanic zone, with its volcanic rocks, still can be seen at Mount Rogers. Massive rhyolite lava flows erupted at the mountain during the Precambrian rifting event. Mount Rogers is also the only place in Virginia that preserves evidence of ancient Proterozoic glaciation.

Spruce-fir forests
 Mount Rogers is the northernmost habitat of the high-altitude Southern Appalachian spruce-fir forests, which are found in only five other locations in the United States: the Great Smoky Mountains, the Black Mountains, the Great Balsam Mountains, Grandfather Mountain, and Roan Mountain. This forest type is one of the few remaining habitats of the Fraser fir, which is only found at high elevations, typically above , in the southern Appalachian Mountains.

These forests have suffered recent declines due to infestations by the balsam woolly adelgid (Adelges piceae), a non-native insect that originated in Europe. It first infested Mount Rogers in 1962 and the entire U.S. population of Fraser firs suffered a 67% mortality rate since, although Mount Rogers was not affected as severely as other locations.

Some researchers have proposed that air pollution in the form of nitrogen and sulfur compounds originating from power plants has been a source of stress to the Fraser firs, resulting in an increased susceptibility to the balsam woolly adelgid, but this relationship has not been confirmed.

Wild ponies
Mount Rogers and the surrounding area is home to around 100 wild ponies, one of the few places in the United States where they live in the wild. According to Smithsonian Magazine, the ponies have lived in the area since the 1940s. In 1974, the Wilburn Ridge Pony Association was formed to help manage the herd and maintain the grassy area where they graze.

See also

 High Knob
 Mount Rogers Cluster
 Mount Rogers National Recreation Area
 Reddish Knob
 Whitetop Mountain

References

Highest points of U.S. states
Mountains of Virginia
Mountains on the Appalachian Trail
George Washington and Jefferson National Forests
Blue Ridge Mountains
Landforms of Grayson County, Virginia
Landforms of Smyth County, Virginia
Volcanism of Virginia
Proterozoic volcanism
Rift volcanism
North American 1000 m summits
Southwest Virginia